Jan Cincibuch (born 6 June 1998) is a Czech rower.

He won a silver medal at the 2018 European Championships.
He won the lightweight scull at the 2019 European Rowing U23 Championships.
He also won the JM4x at the 2016 World Rowing Junior Championships.

References

External links

Veslo

Czech male rowers
1998 births
Living people
Olympic rowers of the Czech Republic
Rowers at the 2020 Summer Olympics
European Rowing Championships medalists